The Grand Parade is a 1930 American drama film directed by Fred C. Newmeyer and starring Helen Twelvetrees, Fred Scott and Richard Carle. It is now considered to be a lost film.

A struggling minstrel show entertainer's life is turned around by the young woman who cares for him.

Cast
 Helen Twelvetrees as Molly 
 Fred Scott as Kelly 
 Richard Carle as Rand 
 Marie Astaire as Polly 
 Russ Powell as Calamity Johnson 
 Bud Jamison as Honey Sullivan
 Jimmie Adams as Jones 
 Lillian Leighton as Madam Stitch 
 Spec O'Donnell as Call Boy 
 Sammy Blum as Sam 
 Tom Malone as Dougherty 
 Jimmy Aubrey as The Drunk

References

Bibliography
 Kennedy, Matthew. Edmund Goulding's Dark Victory: Hollywood's Genius Bad Boy. Terrace Books, 2004.

External links
 

1930 films
1930 drama films
1930s English-language films
American drama films
Films directed by Fred C. Newmeyer
Pathé Exchange films
American black-and-white films
1930s American films